Elections to Strabane District Council were held on 5 May 2005 on the same day as the other Northern Irish local government elections. The election used three district electoral areas to elect a total of 16 councillors.

Election results

Note: "Votes" are the first preference votes.

Districts summary

|- class="unsortable" align="centre"
!rowspan=2 align="left"|Ward
! % 
!Cllrs
! % 
!Cllrs
! %
!Cllrs
! %
!Cllrs
! % 
!Cllrs
!rowspan=2|TotalCllrs
|- class="unsortable" align="center"
!colspan=2 bgcolor="" | Sinn Féin
!colspan=2 bgcolor="" | DUP
!colspan=2 bgcolor="" | SDLP
!colspan=2 bgcolor="" | UUP
!colspan=2 bgcolor="white"| Others
|-
|align="left"|Derg
|bgcolor="#008800"|43.5
|bgcolor="#008800"|3
|28.4
|1
|8.7
|0
|18.3
|1
|1.1
|0
|5
|-
|align="left"|Glenelly
|28.0
|1
|bgcolor="#D46A4C"|42.4
|bgcolor="#D46A4C"|2
|14.2
|1
|15.3
|1
|0.0
|0
|5
|-
|align="left"|Mourne
|bgcolor="#008800"|50.3
|bgcolor="#008800"|4
|0.0
|0
|23.6
|1
|9.4
|0
|16.7
|1
|6
|-
|- class="unsortable" class="sortbottom" style="background:#C9C9C9"
|align="left"| Total
|41.8
|8
|22.2
|3
|15.9
|2
|14.1
|2
|6.0
|1
|16
|-
|}

District results

Derg

2001: 2 x Sinn Féin, 1 x DUP, 1 x UUP, 1 x SDLP
2005: 3 x Sinn Féin, 1 x DUP, 1 x UUP
2001-2005 Change: Sinn Féin gain from SDLP

Glenelly

2001: 2 x DUP, 1 x Sinn Féin, 1 x UUP, 1 x SDLP
2005: 2 x DUP, 1 x Sinn Féin, 1 x UUP, 1 x SDLP
2001-2005 Change: No change

Mourne

2001: 4 x Sinn Féin, 2 x SDLP
2005: 4 x Sinn Féin, 1 x SDLP, 1 x Independent
2001-2005 Change: Independent gain from SDLP

References

Strabane District Council elections
Strabane